Mampato is a Chilean adventure and science fiction comic strip created by cartoonist  and illustrator . Since the third installment, the comic has been developed mainly by Themo Lobos. The comic strip follows the adventures of Mampato, a boy who saves a stranded alien named Xsé, and helps Xsé to save his home planet from the invasion of another alien species called the Mong. Mamapato obtains a belt that allows him to travel through time and space. Using this power, Mampato travels through different time periods on Earth. During his travels, Mampato meets the prehistoric caveman Ogú and the 40th-century mutant telepath Rena, who accompany him on his adventures.

History
Mampato was originally published in the children's magazine . Originally, Mampato was similar to Asterix, however when Themo Lobos took over the writing and art direction of the comic, he insisted on redesigning the characters, making Mampato a boy.  Óscar Vega sporadically drew the comics (for example, "Mampato en el planeta maligno", ["Mampato on the evil planet"]) in Lobos' style.

Lord Cochrane publishing house, the original publisher of Mampato magazine, chose the name Mampato. The publisher already had a trademark on the name Mampato as a supplement to El Mercurio. The word "mampato" means "little frog" in Mapuche and refers to a breed of pony, ; the supplement had stories about a short-legged chubby pony, which reflects Mampato's character design.

The magazine ran from 1968 to 1978. From 1986 to 1993, the adventures of Mampato were reprinted by Cucalón together with other comics by Themo Lobos.

Adaptations
2002:  Animated film Ogu and Mampato in Rapa Nui based on the 1998 strip }.  
2018: The premiere of the animated series The Adventures of Ogú, Mampato and Rena, marking the 50th anniversary of Mampato.

References

External links
A Mampato fan page
Image gallery for: Mampato y ogú rapanui

Further reading
Rojas Flores, Jorge. "Estrategias de poder y valores políticos en Mampato (1968-1978)", N°  71, 2012, pp. 297-314.

Fictional Chilean people
Chilean comics
Science fiction comics
Comics characters introduced in 1968
Child characters in comics
Comics about time travel